Chisom Martins Orji (born 5 April 2001) is a Nigerian international footballer who currently plays as a forward.

Career statistics

International

References

2001 births
Living people
Nigerian footballers
Nigeria international footballers
Association football forwards